Siti Zalina Ahmad (born 2 June 1979) is a Malaysian international lawn bowler.

Bowls career
Siti Zalina Ahmad is from Perak, in Malaysia and is one of only two women to have won two Commonwealth Games singles Gold medals. After watching a game of hockey in 1995 she saw a lawn bowls match and decided to take up the sport.

Commonwealth Games
The first title came in 2002 when she won the Commonwealth Games Singles Gold medal in Manchester and four years later she successfully defended her title winning the Commonwealth Games Singles Gold medal in Melbourne.
 
In the 2010 Commonwealth Games she won her qualifying group with a perfect 10-0 win record and 20-0 set record before losing to Natalie Melmore in the semi finals bringing her eight-year reign as champion to an end. She was also the flag bearer for the Malaysian team during the 2010 games.

She was selected as part of the Malaysian team for the 2018 Commonwealth Games on the Gold Coast in Queensland where she claimed a gold medal in the Pairs with Emma Firyana Saroji.

In 2022, she competed in the women's singles and the women's pairs at the 2022 Commonwealth Games. In the singles she secured a bronze medal.

World Championship
Zalina has also won one world championship medal, a bronze at the 2008 World Outdoor Bowls Championship in Christchurch, New Zealand. In 2020 she was selected for the 2020 World Outdoor Bowls Championship in Australia.

International
Zalina has won eleven medals at the Asia Pacific Bowls Championships, including three gold medals and a double bronze at the 2019 Asia Pacific Bowls Championships in the Gold Coast, Queensland. She has also won three titles at the Hong Kong International Bowls Classic, consisting of the 2014 and 2018 singles title and the 2008 pairs title with Nor Hashimah Ismail.

In the Southeast Asian Games she has won three gold medals.

National
She also won the 2008 singles title at the New Zealand National Bowls Championships when bowling as an overseas invitational player.

Personal life
Her occupation is a Police Officer and is nicknamed Lina.

References

External links
  (2010)
  (2014)
 
 
 
 

1979 births
Living people
Malaysian female bowls players
Commonwealth Games medallists in lawn bowls
Commonwealth Games gold medallists for Malaysia
Commonwealth Games bronze medallists for Malaysia
Bowls players at the 2002 Commonwealth Games
Bowls players at the 2006 Commonwealth Games
Bowls players at the 2010 Commonwealth Games
Bowls players at the 2018 Commonwealth Games
Bowls players at the 2022 Commonwealth Games
Southeast Asian Games medalists in lawn bowls
Southeast Asian Games silver medalists for Malaysia
Southeast Asian Games gold medalists for Malaysia
Competitors at the 1999 Southeast Asian Games
Competitors at the 2001 Southeast Asian Games
Competitors at the 2005 Southeast Asian Games
Competitors at the 2007 Southeast Asian Games
Competitors at the 2017 Southeast Asian Games
Competitors at the 2019 Southeast Asian Games
20th-century Malaysian women
21st-century Malaysian women
Medallists at the 2002 Commonwealth Games
Medallists at the 2006 Commonwealth Games
Medallists at the 2018 Commonwealth Games
Medallists at the 2022 Commonwealth Games